Julia Michelle Serano (born 1967) is an American writer, musician, spoken-word performer, trans–bi activist, and biologist. She is known for her transfeminist books Whipping Girl (2007), Excluded (2013), and Outspoken (2016). She is also a prolific public speaker who has given many talks at universities and conferences. Her writing is frequently featured in queer, feminist, and popular culture magazines.

Life
Assigned male at birth, Serano has stated that she first consciously recognized in herself a desire to be female during the late 1970s, when she was 11 years old. A few years later, she began crossdressing. At first, she crossdressed secretively, but she eventually started identifying herself openly as a "male crossdresser." Serano attended her first support group for crossdressers in 1994 while she lived in Kansas.

Soon afterward, Serano moved to the San Francisco Bay Area where she met her wife, Dani, in 1998. Around then, Serano began identifying as not only a crossdresser but also transgender and bigender. In 2001, she began medically transitioning and identifying as a trans woman.

Career

Serano earned her PhD in biochemistry and molecular biophysics from Columbia University. She researched genetics and developmental and evolutionary biology at the University of California, Berkeley for 17 years.

Serano is the author of Whipping Girl: A Transsexual Woman on Sexism and the Scapegoating of Femininity. Her second book, Excluded: Making Feminist and Queer Movements More Inclusive, was published on September 10, 2013, by Seal Press. It was named the 16th best nonfiction book of all time by readers of Ms. Magazine. Her third book, Outspoken: A Decade of Transgender Activism and Trans Feminism, she published herself under Switch Hitter Press, which she founded along with Switch Hitter Records. Outspoken is a 2017 Lambda Literary Award finalist. Her 2020 book, 99 Erics: a Kat Cataclysm faux novel, also published by Switch Hitter, won the Publishing Triangle’s 2021 Edmund White Award for Debut Fiction and was an Independent Publisher Book Awards 2021 silver medalist in LGBT+ Fiction.

Her work has appeared in queer, feminist, and pop culture magazines, including Bitch, Clamor, Kitchen Sink, LiP, make/shift, and Transgender Tapestry. Excerpts of her work have appeared in The Believer and The San Francisco Chronicle and on NPR.

Serano has spoken about transgender and trans women's issues at numerous universities, often at queer-, feminist-, psychology-, and philosophy-themed conferences. Her writings have also been used in teaching materials in gender studies courses across the United States.

Serano is a slam poet and has given spoken-word performances at universities as well as at events such as the National Queer Arts Festival, San Francisco Pride Dyke March and Trans March stages, Ladyfest, outCRY!, Femme 2006 and in The Vagina Monologues. She was a guitarist and vocalist for the band Bitesize from 1997 through the early 2000s and has also recorded solo music.

Serano organizes and hosts GenderEnders, a performance series that features the work of transgender, intersex, and genderqueer artists and allies that has produced 20 shows. She received a grant to curate "The Penis Issue: Trans and Intersex Women Speak Their Minds," a spoken-word event, as part of the 2007 National Queer Arts Festival.

She writes social justice articles on the website Medium about topics like transgender identity, LGBTQ+ visibility, and identity politics.

Personal life
She lives in Oakland, California.

Works

Books

Anthologies

References

External links

 

Living people
Activists from the San Francisco Bay Area
American women biochemists
American molecular biologists
American spoken word artists
Columbia University alumni
Bisexual rights activists
Bisexual women
Evolutionary biologists
LGBT people from California
American LGBT musicians
American LGBT scientists
Slam poets
Transfeminists
Transgender musicians
Transgender scientists
Transgender women
Transgender rights activists
Women evolutionary biologists
Women molecular biologists
Writers from the San Francisco Bay Area
1967 births
Thomas Jefferson University alumni
Transgender women musicians
American transgender writers
American bisexual writers